Margarita Ortega (born January 19, 1973) is a Colombian television presenter and actress.

Career
Ortega studied Social Communications and Journalism at the Liberators University in Bogotá. She made her debut as an actress in the 1993 soap opera Behind an Angel. Between 1995 and 1997 she was an anchor in the 7:30 p.m. news program on Caracol Televisión alongside María Lucía Fernández. Following this she appeared in several soap operas, movies, and plays. In 2002 she returned to Caracol news as the presenter of the entertainment section. In 2007 she presented the program Culturama on the state television channel Señal Colombia.

Personal life
In 2010, she married actor Ramiro Meneses in a ceremony attended only by close family members and friends. The couple separated in 2015.

Television
 The Santisimas (2015)
 Rosario Tijeras (2010)
 La quiero a morir (Love her to death) (2008–2009)
 Montecristo (2007)
 Without shame (2007)
 Deception (2006)
 Seven times beloved (2002)
 Lucifer is visiting (2001)
 Love thousand (2001)
 Not Love, Just Frenzy (2001)
 Man and wife (1999)
 God bless (1998)
 The calm waters (1994)
 Behind an angel (1993)

Films
 Ceiba, the Hour of the devil (2002)
 The teacher (2002)
 Bolivar I am (2001)
 Before the rain (2000)
 Double standard (2000)

References

External links
 

1973 births
21st-century Colombian actresses
Living people
Colombian television presenters
Actresses from Cali
Colombian film actresses
Colombian television actresses
Colombian women television presenters